Samuel Lindqvist (10 June 1889 – 24 March 1937) was a Swedish international footballer and football manager. 

Representing Djurgården 1906–11, Samuel Lindqvist played in the Svenska Mästerskapet finals 1906, 1909 and 1910 with the team but never won. Lindqvist debuted for Sweden on 11 September 1910 in a friendly against Norway on Frogner stadion, which was his only appearance for the national team.

He was Djurgårdens IF manager in 1929–32 and in 1932–34 together with Putte Kock.

Samuel Lindqvist also played bowling with Djurgårdens IF and won several national titles in the 1920s.

References

External links 

Sweden international footballers
Djurgårdens IF Fotboll players
Swedish bowling players
Swedish football managers
Djurgårdens IF Fotboll managers